Running Mates is a 1992 American political comedy/drama television film directed by Michael Lindsay-Hogg and starring Diane Keaton, Ed Harris, Ed Begley Jr., and Ben Masters. The film follows the presidential election campaign of Senator Hugh Hathaway, who faces scandal and controversy when his enemies share secrets of Aggie Snow, the woman he is with.

Premise
Running for President, Senator Hugh Hathaway must go up against scandal and controversy after the woman he loves comes under political attack.

Cast
Diane Keaton as Aggie Snow
Ed Harris as Senator Hugh Hathaway
Ed Begley Jr. as Chapman Snow
Ben Masters as Mel Fletcher

See also
 Cinema of the United States
 List of American films of 1992

References

External links 

1992 films
1992 television films
1990s political comedy-drama films
American political comedy-drama films
Films about elections
HBO Films films
American comedy-drama television films
Films directed by Michael Lindsay-Hogg
1990s English-language films
1990s American films